Azahari Siti Nur Fatimah Hj (born 1992) is a Bruneian chess player. In 2015, she won the title of Woman FIDE Master (WFM).

References 

1992 births
Living people
Chess Woman FIDE Masters
Bruneian chess players
Place of birth missing (living people)